Yo Bailo/Don't Call me Crazy (ジョバイロ/DON'T CALL ME CRAZY) is the nineteenth single by the Japanese Pop-rock band Porno Graffitti. It was released on November 16, 2005.

Together with the tie-up with Porno Graffitti second time of both the A-side single (double face single).

"Yo Bailo" means "I Dance" in Spanish. The first image of the title was "Giovanni".

"Yo Bailo" is the TBS drama "Kon-ya Hitori no Bed de(今夜ひとりのベッドで / Tonight in Single Bed)" theme song.

"Don't Call me Crazy" is the "Daihatsu Move" Music in advertising.

Track listing

References

2005 singles
Porno Graffitti songs
SME Records singles
2005 songs